North Montgomery High School is a public high school located in unincorporated Montgomery County, Indiana, near Crawfordsville. It is a part of the North Montgomery School Corporation.

It is the only high school in the district, and it serves some sections of northern Crawfordsville, Darlington, Linden, New Richmond, Waynetown, and Wingate. It also serves the unincorporated area of Garfield.

As of 2022, the school had 549 students and boasted a student/teacher ratio of 12.9. Per pupil expenditures averaged $10,736 in 2022 and 29.3% of students were signed up for free/reduced lunch.

See also
 List of high schools in Indiana
Other high schools in Montgomery County:
 Crawfordsville High School
 Southmont High School

References

External links
 Official Website

Schools in Montgomery County, Indiana
Public high schools in Indiana